The 2002 Anaheim Angels season was the franchise's 42nd, and it ended with the team's first American League pennant and World Series championship.

The Angels finished the regular season with a record of 99-63, 4 games behind the Oakland Athletics in the American League West standings, but qualified for the franchise's first ever wild card playoff berth to return to the postseason for the first time since 1986. Outfielder Garret Anderson led the team with 123 runs batted in and a .539 slugging percentage, was selected for the AL All-Star team, and won the Silver Slugger Award. Jarrod Washburn went 18-6 with a 3.15 earned run average to anchor a pitching staff that allowed the fewest runs in the league.

In the postseason, the Angels defeated the New York Yankees 3-1 in the American League Division Series, then defeated the Minnesota Twins 4-1 in the American League Championship Series to win the AL pennant. The Angels then won the World Series in dramatic fashion when, with a 3-2 series deficit to the San Francisco Giants, they overcame a 5 run deficit in the late innings of Game 6 to force a winner-take-all Game 7, which they won to clinch the series 4-3. The morning after the win, The Orange County Register celebrated the Angels' win with the headline "7th Heaven," referring to the popular television series and fact that it took seven games for the Angels to win the World Series, and in doing so, it sent them to seventh heaven.

2002 was also notable as the season in which the Angels debuted their present-day uniforms, colors, and halo insignia, which replaced the widely ridiculed "periwinkle" uniforms and "winged" insignia they had worn since 1997. It was also the last season the team was owned by The Walt Disney Company, which sold its controlling interest in the team to present-day owner Arte Moreno in 2003.

Off season
The Anaheim Angels focus in the off season leading up to the 2002 season was on how to improve the Angels from the 2001 season when they finished 41 games behind the Seattle Mariners (who won a Major League Baseball record 116 games) in the AL West.

Off season transactions
January 4, 2002: Aaron Sele was signed as a free agent with the Anaheim Angels.
January 31, 2002: Donne Wall was signed as a free agent with the Anaheim Angels.
February 4, 2002: Erick Aybar was signed as a free agent with the Anaheim Angels.
February 7, 2002: Clay Bellinger was signed as a free agent with the Anaheim Angels.

Spring training
The Anaheim Angels' 2002 spring training took place at Tempe Diablo Stadium in Tempe, Arizona. The Angels spring training record was 17-15.

Spring training transactions
March 16, 2002: Julio Ramirez was signed as a free agent with the Anaheim Angels.

Standings

Season standings

American League Wild Card

Record vs. opponents

2002 draft
The 2002 Major League Baseball draft was held on June 4–5.

Regular season

Game log

|-style="background:#fbb"
| 1 || March 31 || Indians || 0–6 || Colón (1–0) || Washburn (0–1) || — || 42,697 || 0–1 || L1
|-

|-style="background:#cfc"
| 2 || April 2 || Indians || 7–5 || Weber (1–0) || Riske (0–1) || Percival (1) || 20,055 || 1–1 || W1
|-style="background:#fbb"
| 3 || April 3 || Indians || 5–6 || Drese (1–0) || Sele (0–1) || Wickman (1) || 18,194 || 1–2  || L1
|-style="background:#cfc"
| 4 || April 5 || @ Rangers || 3–1 || Schoeneweis (1–0) || Valdez (0–1) || Levine (1) || 49,617 || 2–2 || W1
|-style="background:#cfc"
| 5 || April 6 || @ Rangers || 6–3 || Ortiz (1–0) || Irabu (0–1) || Levine (2) || 35,006 || 3–2 || W2
|- style=background:#bbb
|—|| April 7 || @ Rangers || colspan="8" |Postponed (rain) rescheduled for June 24
|-style="background:#fbb"
| 6 || April 8 || Mariners || 4–5 || Hasegawa (1–0) || Weber (1–1) || Sasaki (2) || 16,908 || 3–3 || L1
|-style="background:#fbb"
| 7 || April 9 || Mariners || 1–5 || Halama (1–0) || Appier (0–1) || — || 17,210 || 3–4 || L2
|-style="background:#fbb"
| 8 || April 10 || Mariners || 1–8 || Baldwin (2–0) || Sele (0–2) || — || 17,784 || 3–5 || L3
|-style="background:#fbb"
| 9 || April 11 || Mariners || 4–8 || García (1–2) || Schoeneweis (1–1) || — || 18,806 || 3–6 || L4
|-style="background:#fbb"
| 10 || April 12 || Athletics || 1–5 || Hudson (2–0) || Ortiz (1–1) || — || 31,815 || 3–7 || L5
|-style="background:#fbb"
| 11 || April 13 || Athletics || 2–7 || Hiljus (1–1) || Washburn (0–2) || — || 33,554 || 3–8 || L6
|-style="background:#cfc"
| 12 || April 14 || Athletics || 4–1 || Appier (1–1) || Zito (0–1) || Levine (3) || 32,881 || 4–8 || W1
|-style="background:#cfc"
| 13 || April 16 || Rangers || 6–5 (10) || Levine (1–0) || Rocker (0–1) || — || 15,385 || 5–8 || W2
|-style="background:#fbb"
| 14 || April 17 || Rangers || 1–4 || Valdez (1–2) || Schoeneweis (1–2) || Irabu (1) || 15,632 || 5–9 || L1
|-style="background:#fbb"
| 15 || April 18 || @ Athletics || 2–4 || Hiljus (2–1) || Ortiz (1–2) || Koch (3) || 9,145 || 5–10 || L2
|-style="background:#cfc"
| 16 || April 19 || @ Athletics || 9–7 || Washburn (1–2) || Fyhrie (0–1) || Percival (2) || 12,468 || 6–10 || W1
|-style="background:#fbb"
| 17 || April 20 || @ Athletics || 7–8 || Bradford (1–0) || Levine (1–1) || Koch (4) || 20,253 || 6–11 || L1
|-style="background:#fbb"
| 18 || April 21 || @ Athletics || 5–6 || Venafro (1–0) || Percival (0–1) || — || 20,088 || 6–12 || L2
|-style="background:#fbb"
| 19 || April 22 || @ Mariners || 5–16 || Moyer (3–1) || Schoeneweis (1–3) || — || 33,119 || 6–13 || L3
|-style="background:#fbb"
| 20 || April 23 || @ Mariners || 0–1 || Franklin (2–0) || Ortiz (1–3) || Sasaki (6) || 32,127 || 6–14 || L4
|-style="background:#cfc"
| 21 || April 24 || @ Mariners || 10–6 || Washburn (2–2) || Abbott (1–2) || — || 37,212 || 7–14 || W1
|-style="background:#cfc"
| 22 || April 26 || Blue Jays || 4–0 || Appier (2–1) || Smith (0–1) || Percival (3) || 25,296 || 8–14 || W2
|-style="background:#cfc"
| 23 || April 27 || Blue Jays || 11–4 || Sele (1–2) || Borbón (1–1) || — || 29,112 || 9–14 || W3
|-style="background:#cfc"
| 24 || April 28 || Blue Jays || 8-5 (14) || Lukasiewicz (1–0) || Borbón (1–2) || — || 25,073 || 10–14 || W4
|-style="background:#cfc"
| 25 || April 30 || @ Indians || 21–2 || Ortiz (2–3) || Sabathia (2–3) || — || 24,286 || 11–14 || W5
|-

|-style="background:#cfc"
| 26 || May 1 || @ Indians || 7–2 || Washburn (3–2) || Drese (2–3) || — || 23,536 || 12–14 || W6
|-style="background:#cfc"
| 27 || May 2 || @ Indians || 8–0 || Appier (3–1) || Finley (2–3) || — || 26,068 || 13–14 || W7
|-style="background:#cfc"
| 28 || May 3 || @ Blue Jays || 6–4 || Sele (2–2) || Lyon (1–3) || Percival (4) || 13,183 || 14–14 || W8
|-style="background:#fbb"
| 29 || May 4 || @ Blue Jays || 1–4 || Miller (2–0) || Schoeneweis (1–4) || Escobar (4) || 20,558 || 14–15 || L1
|-style="background:#cfc"
| 30 || May 5 || @ Blue Jays || 8–2 || Ortiz (3–3) || Prokopec (1–4) || — || 24,046 || 15–15 || W1
|-style="background:#fbb"
| 31 || May 7 || Tigers || 0–3 || Greisinger (1–0) || Weber (1–2) || Acevedo (3) || 15,315 || 15–16 || L1
|-style="background:#cfc"
| 32 || May 8 || Tigers || 3–2 || Percival (1–1) || Rodney (0–2) || — || 14,722 || 16–16 || W1
|-style="background:#cfc"
| 33 || May 9 || Tigers || 7–6 || Sele (3–2) || Redman (0–4) || Percival (5) || 15,003 || 17–16 || W2
|-style="background:#cfc"
| 34 || May 10 || White Sox || 19–0 || Schoeneweis (2–4) || Wright (3–4) || || 36,715 || 18–16 || W3
|-style="background:#cfc"
| 35 || May 11 || White Sox || 6–3 || Ortiz (4–3) || Garland (4–2) || Percival (6) || 40,535 || 19–16 || W4
|-style="background:#cfc"
| 36 || May 12 || White Sox || 5–4 || Percival (2–1) || Foulke (0–2) || — || 19,251 || 20–16 || W5
|-style="background:#cfc"
| 37 || May 14 || @ Tigers || 9–2 || Appier (4–1) || Cornejo (1–4) || — || 12,745 || 21–16 || W6
|-style="background:#cfc"
| 38 || May 15 || @ Tigers || 10–1 || Sele (4–2) || Redman (0–5) || — || 12,314 || 22–16  || W7
|- style=background:#bbb
|—|| May 16 || @ Tigers || colspan="8" |Postponed (rain) rescheduled for August 5
|-style="background:#cfc"
| 39 || May 17 || @ White Sox || 8–4 || Schoeneweis (3–4) || Garland (4–3) || Levine (4) || 12,736 || 23–16 || W8
|-style="background:#fbb"
| 40 || May 18 || @ White Sox || 4–10 || Glover (0–1) || Ortiz (4–4) || — || 21,122 || 23–17 || L1
|-style="background:#cfc"
| 41 || May 19 || @ White Sox || 6–1 || Washburn (4–2) || Buehrle (7–3) || || 19,869 || 24–17 || W1
|-style="background:#cfc"
| 42 || May 20 || Royals || 6–3 || Appier (5–1) || Stein (0–2) || Percival (7) || 14,035 || 25–17 || W2
|-style="background:#cfc"
| 43 || May 21 || Royals || 5–1 || Cook (1–0) || Reichert (2–5) || — || 15,593 || 26–17 || W3
|-style="background:#cfc"
| 44 || May 22 || Royals || 7–6 || Weber (2–2) || May (0–2) || Percival (8) || 16,163 || 27–17 || W4
|-style="background:#fbb"
| 45 || May 24 || Twins || 1–5 || Reed (5–2) || Ortiz (4–5) || — || 27,494 || 27–18 || L1
|-style="background:#cfc"
| 46 || May 25 || Twins || 4–3 (13) || Levine (2–1) || Cressend (0–1) || — || 31,820 || 28–18 || W1
|-style="background:#fbb"
| 47 || May 26 || Twins || 2–5 || Milton (7–3) || Appier (5–2) || Guardado (15) || 22,854 || 28–19 || L1
|-style="background:#fbb"
| 48 || May 28 || @ Royals || 4–7 || Byrd (8–2) || Sele (4–3) || Hernández (8) || 11,773 || 28–20 || L2
|-style="background:#cfc"
| 49 || May 29 || @ Royals || 12–2 || Ortiz (5–5) || Affeldt (1–2) || — || 13,662 || 29–20 || W1
|-style="background:#fbb"
| 50 || May 30 || @ Twins || 6–7 (10) || Guardado (1–1) || Pote (0–1) || || 14,521 || 29–21 || L1
|-style="background:#cfc"
| 51 || May 31 || @ Twins || 11–3 || Washburn (5–2) || Milton (7–4) || — || 17,101 || 30–21 || W1
|-

|-style="background:#fbb"
| 52 || June 1 || @ Twins || 2–4 || Lohse (5–3) || Appier (5–3) || Guardado (17) || 17,480 || 30–22 || L1
|-style="background:#cfc"
| 53 || June 2 || @ Twins || 5–4 || Sele (5–3) || Kinney (1–5) || Percival (9) || 18,657 || 31–22 || W1
|-style="background:#cfc"
| 54 || June 3 || Rangers || 5–2 || Ortiz (6–5) || Bell (2–2) || Percival (10) || 15,619 || 32–22 || W2
|-style="background:#cfc"
| 55 || June 4 || Rangers || 3–0 || Schoeneweis (4–4) || Burba (3–3) || Percival (11) || 16,810 || 33–22 || W3
|-style="background:#cfc"
| 56 || June 5 || Rangers || 7–5 (10) || Levine (3–1) || Irabu (2–5) || — || 15,301 || 34–22  || W4
|-style="background:#fbb"
| 57 || June 6 || Rangers || 8–9 || Rogers (7–3) || Appier (5–4) || Telford (1) || 17,948 || 34–23 || L1
|-style="background:#cfc"
| 58 || June 7 || Reds || 4–3 || Sele (6–3) || Reitsma (3–3) || Percival (12) || 35,341 || 35–23  || W1
|-style="background:#fbb"
| 59 || June 8 || Reds || 3–4 || White (3–1) || Cook (1–1) || Graves (19) || 29,881 || 35–24 || L1
|-style="background:#cfc"
| 60 || June 9 || Reds || 7–4 || Schoeneweis (5–4) || Hamilton (3–4) || Percival (13) || 35,501 || 36–24 || W1
|-style="background:#cfc"
| 61 || June 10 || Pirates || 4–3 || Washburn (6–2) || Anderson (5–8) || Percival (14) || 16,861 || 37–24 || W2
|-style="background:#fbb"
| 62 || June 11 || Pirates || 3–7 || Fogg (7–4) || Appier (5–5) || — || 17,755 || 37–25  || L1
|-style="background:#cfc"
| 63 || June 12 || Pirates || 8–5 || Weber (3–2) || Boehringer (1–2) || Percival (15) || 17,096 || 38–25 || W1
|-style="background:#cfc"
| 64 || June 14 || @ Dodgers || 8–4 || Ortiz (7–5) || Ishii (10–2) || — || 51,722 || 39–25 || W2
|-style="background:#fbb"
| 65 || June 15 || @ Dodgers || 5–10 || Pérez (7–3) || Schoeneweis (5–5) || — || 52,165 || 39–26 || L1
|-style="background:#fbb"
| 66 || June 16 || @ Dodgers || 4–5 || Carrara (4–2) || Levine (3–2) || Gagné (23) || 52,183 || 39–27 || L2
|-style="background:#fbb"
| 67 || June 18 || @ Cardinals || 2–7 || Kile (5–4) || Appier (5–6) || — || 39,386 || 39–28 || L3
|-style="background:#fbb"
| 68 || June 19 || @ Cardinals || 2–6 ||Morris (10–4) || Sele (6–4) || — || 35,432 || 39–29 || L4
|-style="background:#cfc"
| 69 || June 20 || @ Cardinals || 3–2 || Schoeneweis (6–5) || Smith (0–5) || Percival (16) || 36,385 || 40–29 || W1
|-style="background:#cfc"
| 70 || June 21 || @ Brewers || 11–4 || Ortiz (8–5) || Quevedo (3–6) || — || 20,289 || 41–29 || W2
|-style="background:#cfc"
| 71 || June 22 || @ Brewers || 8–2 || Washburn (7–2) || Cabrera (3–5) || — || 28,765 || 42–29 || W3
|-style="background:#cfc"
| 72 || June 23 || @ Brewers || 5–2 || Appier (6–6) || Sheets (4–8) || Percival (17) || 23,751 || 43–29 || W4
|-style="background:#fbb"
| 73 || June 24 || @ Rangers || 5–8 || Benoit (2–0) || Sele (6–5) || — ||       0 || 43–30 || L1
|-style="background:#fbb"
| 74 || June 24 || @ Rangers || 2–3 || Burba (4–4) || Lackey (0–1) || — || 23,103 || 43–31 ||  L2
|-style="background:#fbb"
| 75 || June 25 || @ Rangers || 5–11 || Valdez (5–6) || Schoeneweis (6–6) || — || 20,089 || 43–32 || L3
|-style="background:#cfc"
| 76 || June 26 || @ Rangers || 7–6 || Weber (4–2) || Irabu (3–7) || Percival (18) || 29,726 || 44–32 || W1
|-style="background:#cfc"
| 77 || June 27 || @ Rangers || 6–3 || Washburn (8–2) || Bell (3–3) || Percival (19) || 22,077 || 45–32 || W2
|-style="background:#fbb"
| 78 || June 28 || Dodgers || 5–7 || Carrara (5–2) || Shields (0–1) || Gagné (29) || 43,690 || 45–33 || L1
|-style="background:#cfc"
| 79 || June 29 || Dodgers || 7–0 || Sele (7–5) || Ishii (11–4) || — || 43,502 || 46–33 || W1
|-style="background:#cfc"
| 80 || June 30 || Dodgers || 5–1 || Lackey (1–1) || Pérez (9–4) || Weber (1) || 43,059 || 47–33 || W2
|-

|-style="background:#fbb"
| 81 || July 2 || Orioles || 0–3 || Lopez (7–3) || Ortiz (8–6) || Julio (17) || 18,521 || 47–34 || L1
|-style="background:#cfc"
| 82 || July 3 || Orioles || 1–0 || Washburn (9–2) || Erickson (3–8) || Percival (20) || 17,477 || 48–34 || W1
|-style="background:#fbb"
| 83 || July 4 || Orioles || 2–7 || Driskill (6–1) || Appier (6–7) || — || 43,342 || 48–35 || L1
|-style="background:#cfc"
| 84 || July 5 || Devil Rays || 6–5 (10) || Shields (1–1) || Yan (4–4) || — || 23,648 || 49–35 || W1
|-style="background:#cfc"
| 85 || July 6 || Devil Rays || 4–3 || Schoeneweis (7–6) || Colome (1–5) || Percival (21) || 29,513 || 50–35 || W2
|-style="background:#cfc"
| 86 || July 7 || Devil Rays || 2–1 (10) || Percival (3–1) || Harper (3–5) || — || 26,446 || 51–35 || W3
|-style="text-align:center; background:#bbcaff;"
|colspan="10"|73rd All-Star Game in Milwaukee, Wisconsin
|-style="background:#cfc"
| 87 || July 11 || @ Royals || 1–0 || Washburn (10–2) || May (2–6) || Percival (22) || 13,031 || 52–35 || W4
|-style="background:#cfc"
| 88 || July 12 || @ Royals || 11–3 || Appier (7–7) || Suppan (7–7) || — || 24,824 || 53–35 || W5
|-style="background:#fbb"
| 89 || July 13 || @ Royals || 0–4 || Byrd (12–6) || Sele (7–6) || — || 19,504 || 53–36 || L1
|-style="background:#fbb"
| 90 || July 14 || @ Royals || 3–12 || Asencio (2–2) || Ortiz (8–7) || — || 12,457 || 53–37 || L2
|-style="background:#fbb"
| 91 || July 15 || @ Twins || 8–10 || Hawkins (4–0) || Schoeneweis (7–7) || Guardado (29) || 19,189 || 53–38 || L3
|-style="background:#cfc"
| 92 || July 16 || @ Twins || 4–2 || Washburn (11–2) || Milton (11–7) || Weber (2) || 26,258 || 54–38 || W1
|-style="background:#cfc"
| 93 || July 17 || @ Athletics || 10–4 || Appier (8–7) || Hudson (7–8) || — || 38,547 || 55–38 || W2
|-style="background:#fbb"
| 94 || July 18 || @ Athletics || 0–2 || Zito (13–3) || Sele (7–7) || Koch (24) || 15,733 || 55–39 || L1
|-style="background:#cfc"
| 95 || July 19 || Mariners || 15–3 || Ortiz (9–7) || García (11–6) || — || 43,407 || 56–39 || W1
|-style="background:#cfc"
| 96 || July 20 || Mariners || 7–6 || Shields (2–1) || Rhodes (5–2) || Weber (3) || 43,109 || 57–39 || W2
|-style="background:#cfc"
| 97 || July 21 || Mariners || 7–5 || Washburn (12–2) || Nelson (1–2) || Weber (4) || 34,945 || 58–39 || W3
|-style="background:#fbb"
| 98 || July 23 || Athletics || 1–2 || Zito (14–3) || Appier (8–8) || Koch (25) || 25,370 || 58–40 || L1
|-style="background:#cfc"
| 99 || July 24 || Athletics || 5–1 || Sele (8–7) || Hudson (7–9) || — || 25,240 || 59–40 || W1
|-style="background:#cfc"
| 100 || July 25 || Athletics || 5–4 || Shields (3–1) || Mecir (3–3) || Weber (3) || 31,653 || 60–40 || W2
|-style="background:#cfc"
| 101 || July 26 || @ Mariners || 8–0 || Lackey (2–1) || Baldwin (6–7) || — || 45,559 || 61–40 || W3
|-style="background:#fbb"
| 102 || July 27 || @ Mariners || 1–3 || Piñeiro (11–4) || Washburn (12–3) || Sasaki (26) || 45,974 || 61–41 || L1—
|-style="background:#cfc"
| 103 || July 28 || @ Mariners || 1–0 || Appier (9–8) || Sasaki (2–4) || Percival (23) || 45,634 || 62–41 || W1
|-style="background:#cfc"
| 104 || July 29 || Red Sox || 5–4 || Schoeneweis (8–7) || Embree (0–1) || Percival (24) || 27,929 || 63–41 || W2
|-style="background:#fbb"
| 105 || July 30 || Red Sox || 0–6 || Martínez (14–2) || Ortiz (9–8) || — || 32,812 || 63–42 || L1
|-style="background:#fbb"
| 106 || July 31 || Red Sox || 1–2 || Wakefield (5–3) || Lackey (2–2) || Urbina (25) || 28,227 || 63–43 || L2
|-

|-style="background:#cfc"
| 107 || August 1 || Yankees || 2–1 || Washburn (13–3) || Weaver (7–10) || Percival (25) || 42,897 || 64–43 || W1
|-style="background:#fbb"
| 108 || August 2 || Yankees || 0–4 || Pettitte (6–4) || Appier (9–9) || Mendoza (3) || 43,668 || 64–44 || L1
|-style="background:#cfc"
| 109 || August 3 || Yankees || 5–4 || Percival (4–1) || Mendoza (7–3) || — || 43,619 || 65–44 || W1
|-style="background:#fbb"
| 110 || August 4 || Yankees || 5–7 (12) || Stanton (5–1) || Shields (3–2) || Mendoza (4) || 43,455 || 65–45 || L1
|-style="background:#cfc"
| 111 || August 5 || @ Tigers || 6–3 || Lackey (3–2) || Powell (1–2) || Percival (26) || 18,546 || 66–45 || W1
|-style="background:#cfc"
| 112 || August 6 || @ White Sox || 11–2 || Washburn (14–3) || Wright (7–10) || Levine (5) || 17,706 || 67–45 || W2
|-style="background:#fbb"
| 113 || August 7 || @ White Sox || 6–7 || Osuna (6–2) || Donnelly (0–1) || — || 14,253 || 67–46 || L1
|-style="background:#fbb"
| 114 || August 8 || @ White Sox || 2–3 || Parque (1–1) || Sele (8–8) || Marte (5) || 18,165 || 67–47 || L2
|-style="background:#fbb"
| 115 || August 9 || @ Blue Jays || 4–5 || Walker (5–2) || Ortiz (9–9) || Escobar (23) || 18,728 || 67–48 || L3
|-style="background:#cfc"
| 116 || August 10 || @ Blue Jays || 11–4 || Lackey (4–2) || Parris (5–3) || — || 25,118 || 68–48 || W1
|-style="background:#cfc"
| 117 || August 11 || @ Blue Jays || 1–0 || Washburn (15–3) || Halladay (14–5) || Percival (27) || 34,013 || 69–48 || W2
|-style="background:#cfc"
| 118 || August 12 || Tigers || 7–0 || Appier (10–9) || Redman (7–10) || — || 19,709 || 70–48 || W3
|-style="background:#cfc"
| 119 || August 13 || Tigers || 7–6 (12) || Levine (4–2) || Bernero (2–7) || || 19,694 || 71–48 || W4
|-style="background:#cfc"
| 120 || August 14 || Tigers || 5–4 || Ortiz (10–9) || Maroth (4–5) || Percival (28) || 23,391 || 72–48 || W5
|-style="background:#cfc"
| 121 || August 16 || Indians || 5–4 || Lackey (5–2) || Drese (9–9) || Percival (29) || 41,356 || 73–48 || W6
|-style="background:#fbb"
| 122 || August 17 || Indians || 4–9 || Sadler (1–0) || Washburn (15–4) || — || 39,866 || 73–49 || L1
|-style="background:#cfc"
| 123 || August 18 || Indians || 4–1 || Appier (11–9) || Sabathia (8–10) || Percival (30) || 41,059 || 74–49 || W1
|-style="background:#fbb"
| 124 || August 20 || @ Yankees || 5–7 || Pettitte (8–4) || Sele (8–9) || Stanton (2) || 41,619 || 74–50 || L1
|-style="background:#cfc"
| 125 || August 21 || @ Yankees || 5–1 (11) || Weber (5–2) || Weaver (7–11) || — || 46,423 || 75-50 || W1 
|-style="background:#fbb"
| 126 || August 22 || @ Yankees || 2–4 || Wells (14–6) || Lackey (5–3) || Karsay (6) || 43,222 || 75–51 || L1
|-style="background:#fbb"
| 127 || August 23 || @ Red Sox || 1–4 || Martínez (17–3) || Washburn (15–5) || Urbina (30) || 33,221 || 75–52 || L2
|-style="background:#cfc"
| 128 || August 24 || @ Red Sox || 2–0 || Appier (12–9) || Wakefield (7–5) || Percival (31) || 32,510 || 76–52 || W1
|-style="background:#cfc"
| 129 || August 25 || @ Red Sox || 8–3 || Schoeneweis (9–7) || Lowe (17–6) || — || 32,059 || 77–52 || W2
|-style="background:#fbb"
| 130 || August 26 || @ Red Sox || 9–10 (10) || Urbina (1–6) || Shields (3–3) || — || 32,869 || 77–53 || L1
|-style="background:#cfc"
| 131 || August 27 || Devil Rays || 7–3 || Lackey (6–3) || Zambrano (5–6) || Weber (4) || 19,869 || 78–53 || W1
|-style="background:#fbb"
| 132 || August 28 || Devil Rays || 5–8 (10) || Yan (6–7) || Levine (4–3) || — || 17,740 || 78–54 || L1
|-style="background:#cfc"
| 133 || August 29 || Devil Rays || 6–1 || Appier (13–9) || Sturtze (3–14) || — || 18,820 || 79–54 || W1
|-style="background:#cfc"
| 134 || August 30 || Orioles || 6–2 || Callaway (1–0) || Johnson (4–11) || Schoeneweis (1) || 29,959 || 80–54 || W2
|-style="background:#cfc"
| 135 || August 31 || Orioles || 9–0 || Ortiz (11–9) || Erickson (5–12) || — || 38,563 || 81–54 || W3
|-

|-style="background:#cfc"
| 136 || September 1 || Orioles || 9–3 || Lackey (7–3) || Lopez (14–7) || Percival (32) || 24,592 || 82–54 || W4
|-style="background:#cfc"
| 137 || September 3 || @ Devil Rays || 10–2 || Washburn (16–5) || Sosa (1–7) || — || 10,146 || 83–54 || W5
|-style="background:#cfc"
| 138 || September 4 || @ Devil Rays || 4–2 || Appier (14–9) || Sturtze (3–15) || Percival (33) || 10,161 || 84–54 || W6
|-style="background:#cfc"
| 139 || September 5 || @ Devil Rays || 10–1 || Ortiz (12–9) || Kennedy (7–10) || — || 10,135 || 85–54 || W7
|-style="background:#cfc"
| 140 || September 6 || @ Orioles || 6–3 || Lackey (8–3) || Douglass (0–2)  || Percival (34) || 24,045 || 86–54 || W8
|-style="background:#cfc"
| 141 || September 7 || @ Orioles || 4–2 (10) || Weber (6–2) || Julio (5–6) || Percival (35) || 30,714 || 87–54 || W9
|-style="background:#cfc"
| 142 || September 8 || @ Orioles || 6–2 || Washburn (17–5) || Hentgen (0–1) || Weber (5) || 27,665 || 88–54 || W10
|-style="background:#fbb"
| 143 || September 9 || Athletics || 1–2 || Hudson (13–9) || Appier (14–10) || Koch (39) || 28,145 || 89–54 || L1
|-style="background:#cfc"
| 144 || September 10 || Athletics || 5–2 || Ortiz (13–9) || Lilly (4–7) || Percival (36) || 35,323 || 89–55 || W1
|-style="background:#cfc"
| 145 || September 11 || Athletics || 6–5 || Shields (4–3) || Tam (0–1) || Percival (37) || 34,302 || 90–55 || W2
|-style="background:#cfc"
| 146 || September 12 || Athletics || 7–6 || Donnelly (1–1) || Koch (9–3) || — || 31,304 || 91–55 || W3
|-style="background:#cfc"
| 147 || September 13 || Rangers || 3–2 || Washburn (18–5) || Benoit (3–4) || Percival (38) || 35,345 || 92–55 || W4
|-style="background:#cfc"
| 148 || September 14 || Rangers || 8–6 || Shields (5–3) || Van Poppel (3–2) || Percival (39) || 39,909 || 93–55 || W5
|-style="background:#cfc"
| 149 || September 15 || Rangers || 13–4 || Ortiz (14–9) || Rogers (13–8) || — || 33,445 || 94–55 || W6
|-style="background:#fbb"
| 150 || September 16 || @ Athletics || 3–4 || Koch (10–3) || Levine (4–3) || — || 22,326 || 94–56 || L1
|-style="background:#cfc"
| 151 || September 17 || @ Athletics || 1–0 (10) || Weber (7–2) || Koch (10–4) || Percival (40) || 25,894 || 95–56 || W1
|-style="background:#fbb"
| 152 || September 18 || @ Athletics || 4–7 || Zito (22–5) || Callaway (1–1) || Koch (40) || 50,734 || 95–57 || L1
|-style="background:#fbb"
| 153 || September 19 || @ Athletics || 3–5 || Hudson (15–9) || Appier (14–11) || Koch (41) || 27,435 || 95–58 || L2
|-style="background:#cfc"
| 154 || September 20 || @ Mariners || 8–1 || Ortiz (15–9) || Piñeiro (14–7) || — || 45,663 || 96–58 || W1
|-style="background:#fbb"
| 155 || September 21 || @ Mariners || 4–6 || García (16–10) || Lackey (8–4) || Sasaki (36) || 45,784 || 96–59 || L1
|-style="background:#fbb"
| 156 || September 22 || @ Mariners || 2–3 || Franklin (7–4) || Washburn (18–6) || Nelson (2) || 45,693 || 96–60 || L2
|-style="background:#fbb"
| 157 || September 24 || @ Rangers || 1–2 || Benoit (4–4) || Appier (14–12) || Cordero (9) || 21,869 || 96–61 || L3
|-style="background:#fbb"
| 158 || September 25 || @ Rangers || 3–4 || Seánez (1–3) || Schoeneweis (9–8) || Cordero (10) || 20,976 || 96–62 || L4
|-style="background:#cfc"
| 159 || September 26 || @ Rangers || 10–5 || Lackey (9–4) || Lewis (1–3) || — || 21,774 || 97–62 || W1
|-style="background:#fbb"
| 160 || September 27 || Mariners || 6–7 (12) || Halama (6–5) || Pote (0–2) || — || 43,452 || 97–63 || L1
|-style="background:#cfc"
| 161 || September 28 || Mariners || 8–4 || Callaway (2–1) || Franklin (7–5) || — || 43,202 || 98–63 || W1
|-style="background:#cfc"
| 162 || September 29 || Mariners || 7–6 || Lukasiewicz (2–0) || Valdez (8–12) || Donnelly (1) || 42,878 || 99–63 || W2
|-

|- style="text-align:center;"
| Legend:       = Win       = Loss       = PostponementBold = Angels team member

Roster

Regular season transactions
July 31, 2002: Alex Ochoa was traded by the Milwaukee Brewers with Sal Fasano to the Anaheim Angels for players to be named later and Jorge Fábregas. The Anaheim Angels sent Johnny Raburn (minors) (August 14, 2002) and Pedro Liriano (September 20, 2002) to the Milwaukee Brewers to complete the trade.

Player stats

Batting

Starters by position
Note: Pos. = Position; G = Games played; AB = At bats; H = Hits; Avg. = Batting average; HR = Home runs; RBI = Runs batted in

Other batters
Note: Pos = Position; G = Games played; AB = At bats; H = Hits; Avg. = Batting average; HR = Home runs; RBI = Runs batted in

Pitching

Starting pitchers
Note: G = Games pitched; IP = Innings pitched; W = Wins; L = Losses; ERA = Earned run average; SO = Strikeouts

Other pitchers
Note: G = Games pitched; IP = Innings pitched; W = Wins; L = Losses; SV = Saves; ERA = Earned run average; SO = Strikeouts

Relief pitchers
Note: G = Games pitched; IP = Innings pitched; W = Wins; L = Losses; SV = Saves; ERA = Earned run average; SO = Strikeouts

Postseason
With their 10-5  win over the Texas Rangers  on Monday, September 26, 2002, the Angels clinched their first (and only to date as of 2021) Wildcard berth. At this time, the Angels would be in the postseason for the first time since the 1986 season.

American League Division Series

The 2002 American League Division Series featured the Wild Card winner Anaheim Angels and the AL East champion New York Yankees. The series began on October 1, 2002 with the Angels splitting the first two games at Yankee Stadium. The Angels then proceeded to win the next two games, earning their ticket to the ALCS and winning their first postseason series in franchise history, ending New York's bid for a fifth consecutive World Series appearance.

Game One
October 1, 2002 at Yankee Stadium (I) in Bronx, NY

Game Two
October 2, 2002 at Yankee Stadium (I) in Bronx, NY

Game Three
October 4, 2002 at Edison International Field of Anaheim in Anaheim, CA

Game Four
October 5, 2002 at Edison International Field of Anaheim in Anaheim, CA

American League Championship Series

The 2002 American League Championship Series featured the Wild Card winner Anaheim Angels and the AL Central champion Minnesota Twins. The series began on October 8, 2002 with the Angels splitting the first two games at the Hubert H. Humphrey Metrodome. The Angels then went home where they won three straight at Edison Field to earn a spot in the 2002 World Series. Infielder Adam Kennedy was the ALCS MVP.

Game One
October 8, 2002 at Hubert H. Humphrey Metrodome in Minneapolis

Game Two
October 9, 2002 at Hubert H. Humphrey Metrodome in Minneapolis

Game Three
October 11, 2002 at Edison International Field of Anaheim in Anaheim, California

Game Four
October 12, 2002 at Edison International Field of Anaheim in Anaheim, California

Game Five
October 13, 2002 at Edison International Field of Anaheim in Anaheim, California

World Series

The 2002 World Series was the 98th edition of the Fall Classic, held from October 19–27, 2002. The series featured the American League champion Anaheim Angels defeating the National League champion San Francisco Giants, 4–3, to win the franchise's first ever World Series.

The series was notable as being the first time since the 1995 inception of the wild card in Major League Baseball that two wild card teams would vie for the title. It was also the last Series to be played in a full seven games until 2011.

The series was played as a best-of-seven playoff with a 2–3–2 site format (standard in Major League Baseball).  Barry Bonds of the Giants was almost elected World Series MVP before the Angels began their Game 6 comeback; the award would be presented the following night to Troy Glaus of the Angels for his role in that comeback.  (Bobby Richardson of the 1960 New York Yankees remains the only World Series MVP from a losing team.)

Game One
October 19, 2002 at Edison International Field of Anaheim in Anaheim, CA

Game Two
October 20, 2002 at Edison International Field of Anaheim in Anaheim, CA

Game Three
Tuesday, October 22, 2002 at Pacific Bell Park in San Francisco

Game Four
October 23, 2002 at Pacific Bell Park in San Francisco

Game Five
Thursday, October 24, 2002 at Pacific Bell Park in San Francisco

Game Six
October 26, 2002 at Edison International Field of Anaheim in Anaheim, CA

Game Seven
October 27, 2002 at Edison International Field of Anaheim in Anaheim, CA

Game log

|-style="background:#fbb"
| 1 || October 1 || @ Yankees || 5–8 || Karsay (1–0) || Weber (0–1) || Rivera (1) || 56,710 || 0–1 || L1
|-style="background:#cfc"
| 2 || October 2 || @ Yankees || 8–6 || Rodríguez (1–0) || Hernández (0–1) || Percival (1) || 56,695 || 1–1 || W1
|-style="background:#cfc"
| 3 || October 4 || Yankees || 9–6 || Rodríguez (2–0) || Stanton (0–1) || Percival (2) || 45,072 || 2–1  || W2
|-style="background:#cfc"
| 4 || October 5 || Yankees || 9–5 || Washburn (1–0) || Wells (0–1) || — || 45,067 || 3–1 || W3
|-

|-style="background:#fbb"
| 1 || October 8 || @ Twins || 1–2 || Mays (1–0) || Appier (0–1) || Guardado (1) || 55,562 || 0–1 || L1
|-style="background:#cfc"
| 2 || October 9 || @ Twins || 6–3 || Ortiz (1–0) || Reed (0–1) || Percival (1) || 55,990 || 1–1 || W1
|-style="background:#cfc"
| 3 || October 11 || Twins || 2–1 || Rodríguez (1–0) || Romero (0–1) || Percival (2) || 44,234 || 2–1 || W2
|-style="background:#cfc"
| 4 || October 12 || Twins || 7–1 || Lackey (1–0) || Radke (0–1) || — || 44,830 || 3–1 || W3
|-style="background:#cfc"
| 5 || October 13 || Twins || 13–5 || Rodríguez (2–0) || Santana (0–1) || — || 44,835 || 4–1 || W4
|-

|-style="background:#fbb"
| 1 || October 19 || Giants || 3–4 || Schmidt (1–0) || Washburn (0–1) || Nen (1) || 44,603 || 0–1 || L1
|-style="background:#cfc"
| 2 || October 20 || Giants || 11–10 || Rodríguez (1–0) || Rodríguez (0–1) || Percival (1) || 44,584 || 1–1  || W1
|-style="background:#cfc"
| 3 || October 22 || @ Giants || 10–4 || Ortiz (1–0) || Hernández (0–1) || — || 42,707 || 2–1 || W2
|-style="background:#fbb"
| 4 || October 23 || @ Giants || 3–4 || Worrell (1–0) || Rodríguez (1–1) || Nen (2) || 42,703 || 2–2 || L1
|-style="background:#fbb"
| 5 || October 24 || @ Giants || 4–16 || Zerbe (1–0) || Washburn (0–2) || — || 42,713 || 2–3 || L2
|-style="background:#cfc"
| 6 || October 26 || Giants || 6–5 || Donnelly (1–0) || Worrell (1–1) || Percival (2) || 44,506 || 3–3 || W1
|-style="background:#cfc"
| 7 || October 27 || Giants || 4–1 || Lackey (1–0) || Hernández (0–2) || Percival (3) || 44,598 || 4–3 || W2
|-

|- style="text-align:center;"
| Legend:       = Win       = Loss       = PostponementBold = Angels team member

Bracket

The American League champion had home field advantage during the World Series. 
Note: Major League Baseball's playoff format automatically seeds the Wild Card team 4th. Normally, the No. 1 seed plays the No. 4 seed in the Division Series. However, MLB does not allow the No. 1 seed to play the 4th seed/Wild Card winner in the Division Series if they are from the same division, instead having the No. 1 seed play the next lowest seed, the No. 3 seed.

Awards and honors
2002 Anaheim Angels
 2003 Outstanding Team ESPY Award

Troy Glaus
 World Series MVP

Adam Kennedy
 ALCS MVP

Tim Salmon
 Hutch Award

Garret Anderson
 All-Star
 Silver Slugger Award
 #4 in AL in RBI (123)

Darin Erstad
 Gold Glove Award

Bengie Molina
 Gold Glove Award

Mike Scioscia
 AL Manager of the Year Award

73rd Major League Baseball All-Star Game

Outfielders

Coaches

Farm system

Local media
Local television

Local cable television

Local radio

Some radio games carried on KPLS–AM 830 because of broadcast conflict with the Los Angeles Lakers of the (NBA).

References
Notes

Sources
2002 Anaheim Angels team at Baseball-Reference
2002 Anaheim Angels team at baseball-almanac.com

Los Angeles Angels seasons
American League champion seasons
World Series champion seasons
Anaheim Angels
Los